Md. Yusof bin Md. Haslam (born 24 April 1954) is a Malaysian actor, film director and producer. He is best known for his longest-running police procedural drama series Gerak Khas, a TV series that he created, directed and produced. The latter spurring three feature films. The immense popularity of his films had led him to be nicknamed the "Six Million Dollar Man".

His legacy in entertainment showbiz is now carried by his two sons, Syamsul and Syafiq. Yusof also has his own television and film production company, Skop Productions, where he served as the managing director.

Early life and film career 
Yusof was born on 24 April 1954 in Jalan Pahang, Kuala Lumpur to housewife Bahyah Talib and lorry driver Md. Haslam Khan. He is a fourth child from among seven siblings who together lived in a house in the squatter settlement. He received his education at the SMK Aminuddin Baki in Kuala Lumpur.

He became enamoured with movies through his experiences seeing Hollywood westerns and Bollywood films—with the latter, he considered one of the stars Shashi Kapoor as his acting idol. Yusof thus decided that he would become an actor, much to objections by his father who believed that the entertainment scene held no future prospects.

Yusof took up profession as a bus conductor, but he also secretly attended acting auditions. He began his involvement in acting by playing an extra character in Laksamana Do Re Mi in 1972, as match spectators . It would only be until in 1975 that he would take a leading main role through the film Permintaan Terakhir.

Directing career 
He began directing films in 1991 with Bayangan Maut, a mystery action thriller film starring rock singer Ella. This was later followed by Pemburu Bayang in 1993, Sembilu in 1994, best-selling blockbuster film, Maria Mariana in 1996 plus its sequel two years after among others.

Apart from film and television, he is also a managing director of his production company, Skop Productions which he had established since 1985. The company has four subsidiaries – Haslam Trading (restaurant), Haslam Properties (real estate and properties), Skop Publishing (print publications) and ME Communications (post-production facilities).

He was awarded the Ahli Mangku Negara in 1993 and the Panglima Jasa Negara in 2001, which carries the title of Dato', for his contributions to Malaysian cinema.

Personal life 
Yusof married twice. His first marriage was with Raja Noor Saadah Salehuddin in 1978 and divorced in 1980, they have no children. He later married Fatimah Ismail in 1982. They have four children namely Faizal, Syamsul, Shamin and Syafiq. Syamsul and Syafiq themselves are also actor and film directors.

Filmography

Feature films

Television series

Telemovie

Television

Honours

Honours of Malaysia 
  : Member of the Order of the Defender of the Realm (A.M.N.) (1993)
  : Commander of the Order of Meritorious Service (P.J.N.) (2001)
  : Assistant Commissioner of Police (Kehormat) Award by the Malaysian Royal Police (2012)
  : Honorary Degree of Doctor of Arts (Films) at the Open University Malaysia (2018)

References

External links 
 

1954 births
Living people
Malaysian film directors
Malaysian people of Malay descent
Malaysian people of Pakistani descent
Malay-language film directors
Merdeka Film Productions contract players
People from Kuala Lumpur
Malaysian male actors
20th-century Malaysian male actors
Members of the Order of the Defender of the Realm
Commanders of the Order of Meritorious Service